Video Sound is the second release of the Canadian rock band The Waking Eyes. The album was produced by Arnold Lanni who is known for his work with many Canadian bands such as Our Lady Peace, Simple Plan, Thousand Foot Krutch and Finger Eleven.

Tracks
All songs written by The Waking Eyes
"Watch Your Money"
"Beginning"
"Move On"
"On A Train"
"Headlights"
"Waiting"
"Takin’ The Hard Way"
"More Than What You’re Given"   
"But I Already Have It"
"Get Up Easy"
"If You Know Why"

Personnel
Matt Peters - Lead vocals, guitar, and keyboard
Russ Doerksen - Bass
Steve Senkiw - Drums
Rusty Matyas - Guitar, backing vocals

References

2004 albums
The Waking Eyes albums
Albums produced by Arnold Lanni